Eschweiler is a village in the commune of Junglinster, in central Luxembourg.  , it had a population of 181.

References

Junglinster
Villages in Luxembourg